Gunnery may refer to:
 The use of guns or the study of how to apply the techniques and procedures of operating them
 The operation of artillery
 The operation of naval artillery
 The Gunnery, a coeducational prep school in Connecticut, United States

See also
 Gunner (disambiguation)